The National Union of Greece (Ethniki Enosis Ellados or EEE) was a far-right political party established in Thessaloniki, Greece, in 1927.

Registered as a mutual aid society, the EEE was founded by Asia Minor refugee businesspeople. According to the organisation's constitution, only Christians could join. Its members were in political and, especially, commercial antagonism with Thessaloniki's substantial Jewish population.

It was eventually led by Georgios Kosmidis, a banking clerk. Estimates put the party's strength at 7,000 members in 1932; by 1933, it had 3,000 of its members march to Athens, in apparent imitation of Benito Mussolini's 1922 March on Rome. However, it polled poorly in the 1934 city elections in Thessaloniki, and in 1935, the party dissolved as a result of political in-fighting.

Owing to its paramilitary uniforms and organisation, the party was commonly referred to as "The Three Epsilons" or "The Steelhelmets", in allusion to the German paramilitary .

References

External links
 History of the EEE

Further reading
 Mark Mazower, Salonica, City of Ghosts: Christians, Muslims and Jews, 1430-1950, London: HarperCollins, 2004. 

Defunct nationalist parties in Greece
Antisemitism in Greece
Fascism in Greece
.
Greek Macedonia in World War II
Politics of Thessaloniki
Modern history of Thessaloniki
1920s in Greece
1930s in Greece
1940s in Greek politics
Political parties established in 1927
Political parties disestablished in 1944
1927 establishments in Greece
1944 disestablishments in Greece
Nazi parties
German occupation of Thessaloniki
Eastern Orthodox political parties